John Francis O'Neil (April 19, 1920 – April 18, 2012) was a shortstop in Major League Baseball who played briefly during the  season.

Born in Shelbiana, Kentucky, John O'Neil was involved in professional baseball for more than 45 years spanning 1939–1986 as player, manager, player/manager, general manager and scout, while participating in over 1,800 minor league games.

O'Neil appeared in 32 games for the 1946 Philadelphia Phillies as a replacement for everyday shortstop Skeeter Newsome, being also used in pinch-hitting and pinch-running situations in 14 games.

In a 46-game career, O'Neil posted a batting average of .266 (25-for-94) with three doubles, driving in nine runs while scoring 12 times without any stolen base.

From 1964 through 1984 he scouted for several major league teams, including the Milwaukee and Atlanta Braves teams and Los Angeles Dodgers. Two of the players he scouted and signed were catcher Mike Scioscia and outfielder Bill Robinson.

O'Neil was honored by the Chautauqua Sports Hall of Fame at Russell Diethrick Park in the summer of 2011 with a white Jamestown Falcons uniform top with No. 1 on his back, similar to the uniform he wore back in the 1940s.  It was during the 70th anniversary of the park, previously known as Municipal Stadium, and O'Neil, lone survivor of the 1941 Jamestown club, was honored by throwing out the inaugural first pitch. He later received honors as the oldest Chautauqua Sports Hall of Fame Inductee at the organization's 31st annual induction dinner on February 20, 2012.

Outside of baseball, he was an avid golfer and fisherman with memberships at Chautauqua and Corry Hills golf clubs, and was also a member of Lakewood Rod and Gun Club.

O'Neil died in Jamestown, New York, one day short of reaching his 92nd birthday.

Sources

Major League Baseball shortstops
Philadelphia Phillies players
Minor league baseball managers
Bristol Twins players
Buffalo Bisons (minor league) players
Elmira Pioneers players
Greeneville Burley Cubs players
Hollywood Stars players
Jamestown Falcons players
Jamestown Tigers players
New Orleans Pelicans (baseball) players
Oakland Oaks (baseball) players
Pittsfield Electrics players
Portland Beavers players
Salinas Packers players
San Francisco Seals (baseball) players
Seattle Rainiers players
Tallahassee Capitals players
Winston-Salem Twins players
Baseball players from Kentucky
People from Pike County, Kentucky
Atlanta Braves scouts
Los Angeles Dodgers scouts
Milwaukee Braves scouts
1920 births
2012 deaths